Time of My Life is the fifth studio album by Canadian country music artist George Fox. It was released by Warner Music Canada in 1995. The album peaked at number 4 on the RPM Country Albums chart and was certified gold by the CRIA.

Track listing
"First Comes Love" – 3:12
"A Matter of Fact" – 2:42
"How Big a Room" – 3:27
"Time of My Life" – 3:25
"Mr. Hide" – 4:01
"What's Holding Me" – 3:38
"So Many Tears" – 3:38
"Here's Hoping" – 4:03
"Rodeo Man" – 3:45
"Colt Thunder" – 4:10

Chart performance

References

External links
[ Time of My Life] at Allmusic

1995 albums
George Fox albums
Albums produced by Bob Gaudio